The Afghan National Army Commando Corps (formerly ANA Commando Brigade; ANA Commando Battalion) was a commando force of the Afghan National Army (ANA). During the Taliban insurgency, the commandos comprised 7% of the Afghan National Security Forces but conducted 70% to 80% of the fighting. The unit structure was based on the 75th Ranger Regiment.

After the Fall of Kabul and the collapse of the ANA and Islamic Republic of Afghanistan, the Commandos have been virtually dissolved.

Selection and training 
The first Commando battalion was formed from existing infantry battalions. In early 2007, a program began to take one conventional infantry kandak (battalion) from each of the regional ANA corps, give them special training and equipment, and reorganize them based on the 75th Ranger Regiment of the United States Army. Each battalion was assigned to one of the six regional corps.

The camp was reported as being in either Wardak Province or Kabul Province.

The 12-week course ran three separate training programmes for different parts of the nascent unit at the same time. The primary and bulk of the training was geared for the infantry toli (company), with a focus on individual skills and small unit tactics. To support the fighting companies, the Headquarters and Headquarters Toli received other training such as in mortars, medical care, and communications. The third section focused on the kandak staff, and their command and control functions.

The unit recruits from all over Afghanistan from various Afghan Army units, taking in prospective Pashtuns, Tajik, Hazara, Uzbek and Turkmen to prevent forms of tribal allegiance and bias.

The first Commando Kandak graduated on July 24, 2007, with Col. Fareed Ahmadi as the kandak commander.
Upon graduation, each Commando Kandak returned to its designated corps area along with an embedded U.S. Army Special Forces A-Team, and began going through an 18-week cycle: six weeks each of train-up, missions and recovery. 3rd Special Forces Group and 7th Special Forces Group rotated responsibility to train and advise in Afghanistan.

While the original International Security Assistance Force plan was for one Brigade with six Kandaks (Battalions), the ANA had originally wanted a full division with three Brigades and 15 Kandaks.

After the fall of Kabul in 2021 
During the 2021 Taliban offensive, 22 Commandos were executed by the Taliban in the Faryab Province after surrendering. While the Taliban were known to show leniency to normal ANA troops, Commandos and Air Force pilots were especially targeted by the Taliban.

Following the fall of Kabul to the Taliban, on August 17, 2021, several ANA commandos were reported to be moving to Panjshir, joining the National Resistance Front of Afghanistan.

Around 500–600 Afghan troops made up mostly of commandos were reported to have also refused to surrender in Kabul and instead joined up with US forces at Hamid Karzai International Airport, helping them secure the outer perimeter of the airport during the 2021 evacuation from Afghanistan.

Some Afghan commandos were evacuated to the UK. On 1 September 2021, Forbes magazine reported that the United Kingdom was contemplating recruiting such evacuated commandos into the British Army.

In October 2022, the Russian armed forces reportedly started to recruit ex-Afghan commandos to Ukraine. An interview with Major General Kyrylo Budanov confirms sightings of ex-Afghan commandos deployed in Ukraine.

Notes

References 

 

Military units and formations of Afghanistan
Commando units and formations
Military units and formations established in 2007
Military units and formations of the War in Afghanistan (2001–2021)